Qoliabad (also Romanized as Qolīābād; also known as Gholi Abad, Gholi Kand, and Quliābād) is a village in Hajjilu Rural District, in the Central District of Kabudarahang County, Hamadan Province, Iran. At the 2006 census, its population was 24, in 6 families.

References 

Populated places in Kabudarahang County